FIBO Group (full name International Financial Holding FIBO Group) is an international financial holding company established in 1998 that provides online trading services (brokerage) mainly on foreign exchange market (Forex). It also offers an electronic trading platform for the purchase and sale of financial securities, CFDs, commodities and cryptocurrencies.

Corporate structure
The firm owns British Virgin Islands registered FIBO Group, Ltd., Cyprus based FIBO Group Holdings, Ltd., Australian based FIBO Australia Pty Ltd., Singapore based FIBO Group Asia Pte Ltd. and Moscow based ООО Fibo Group. Holding company is headquartered in Vienna (Austria). As of 2016, the company also had offices in Cyprus, Germany, Russia, British Virgin Islands, Kazakhstan, China and Singapore.

History 
FIBO group was established in 1998 as an investment consulting firm Financial Intermarket Brokerage On-Line (FIBO). FIBO Group started to offer online brokerage service for currency trading in 2003 adding CFDs in 2004.

FIBO Group was a prominent player on the Russian financial market. In 2005, it was one of the first Forex brokers in Russia along with Kalita Finance and Forex Club. In 2006, it sponsored intra-day Forex trading competition for professional traders and students of Plekhanov Russian University of Economics, one of the first such contests in Russia.  In 2011, with 35,5 thousand retail clients FIBO Group was 4th largest Forex broker in Russia. The firm, however, lost its competitive edge, moving to the 12th place in 2013 and keeping this position as of 2016 with just 6,5 thousand clients.

In 2017, FIBO Group added cryptocurrency derivative product to one of its trading platforms. As of 2018, FIBO Group was among top-20 global Forex brokers.

Operations 
FIBO Group operates retail foreign exchange and CFD trading brands, FOREX.com and City Index, as well as GTX offering facilities in PAMM, Automated Trading (including signals), and Asset Management. Trading is provided via one of the electronic trading platforms MetaTrader 4, Metatrader 5 and cTrader. It also provides DealSmart platform for technical analysis.

References

External links
 

Financial services companies established in 1998
1998 establishments in Cyprus
Financial services companies of Austria
Online brokerages
Foreign exchange companies
Financial derivative trading companies